The Flag Officer Commanding, Iceland (C) was an appointment of the British Royal Navy during the Second World War. His headquarters were at the stone frigate HMS Baldur, based at Hvitanes, in Hvalfjörður fjord, on the west coast of Iceland. It was initially administered by the Admiral Commanding, Iceland (C), then as the Flag Officer Commanding, Iceland (C), from 1942 to 1945.

History
Following the German invasion of Denmark in April 1940, Iceland, then in personal union with Denmark, declared neutrality throughout the rest of the war. Iceland's location was of strategic importance to the British who decided to station naval forces at a naval base called HMS Baldur at Hvitanes following the invasion of Iceland in May 1940. In addition it also established an accounting and accommodation shore base called HMS Baldur II. Iceland was an important base for North Atlantic convoys, patrol and anti-submarine duties.

The Admiralty appointed a flag officer to administer the station. On 5 September 1941 Rear-Admiral Frederick Dalrymple-Hamilton was appointed as Admiral Commanding, Iceland, serving until August 1942.

His title changed to Flag officer Commanding, Iceland (C) in 1943. During the war Winston Churchill instructed British officers to refer to the country as Iceland (C) due to someone ordering a ship to go to Ireland instead of Iceland at the beginning of the war.

On 31 October 1943 Bertram Watson was appointed Flag Officer Commanding, Iceland, where he served in the rank of Rear Admiral until 7 August 1945. The 1945 Navy List records Watson as holding the position in the rank of Vice Admiral.

References

External links 
 https://www.naval-history.net/xDKWW2-4201-40RNShips1Home.htm - listing of ships under Iceland Command January 1942, including five anti-submarine groups, a minesweeping group, and the 106th Motor Launch Flotilla (four MLs)

Flag officers of the Royal Navy